The 1st Foreign Parachute Battalion was a parachute battalion of the Foreign Legion formed from the Parachute Company of the 3rd Foreign Infantry Regiment.

History 

 1er Bataillon Etranger de Parachutistes, 1er BEP - I, II, III Formations -

The 1st Foreign Parachute Battalion, (1er BEP, I formation) was created on July 1, 1948 at Khamisis, in Algeria. The 1er BEP embarks in Indochina on November 12 and is engaged in combat operations in the Tonkin. On June 1, 1949, the Co. Para du 3ème REI completed its count. On November 17, 1950; the 1er BEP (1er BEP, I Formation) jumps on That Khé and sacrifices itself in Coc Xa to protect the unfolding of the RC4 in a traditional Foreign Legion battlefield. Heading and leading tradition was 1er BEP battalion commander Chef de Corps du 1er BEP, Commandant Pierre Segrétain. Segrétain was fatally wounded while leading the BEP during the Battle of Route Coloniale 4.
 
The battalion dissolved on December 31, 1950; is reconstituted on March 1, 1951 (1er BEP, II formation) and is seen participating excessively in combat operations at Cho Ben, on the black river and at Annam. On November 21, 1953; the reconstituted 1er BEP is parachuted on Dien Bien Phu. In this gigantic battle, the reconstituted (1er BEP, II formation) 1er BEP counts 575 killed and missing for the second time in a traditional Foreign Legion battlefield. Amongst the fatal casualties feature Lieutenants Dumont, Boisbouvier and de Stabenrath, killed in between April 1 and May 13 as well as Sergent-Chef Grimault, killed on March 30. Reconstituted for the third time (1er BEP, III formation) on May 19, 1954, the 1er BEP leaves Indochina on February 8, 1955. The 1er BEP totals 5 citations at the orders of the armed forces and the fourragère of the colors of the Médaille militaire. The 1st Foreign Parachute Battalion (1er BEP, III Formation) becomes the 1st Foreign Parachute Regiment (1er REP) in Algeria on September 1, 1955.

The insignia of the 1st Foreign Paratrooper Battalion was created in 1948 by Commandant Segrétain, battalion commander Chef de Bataillon, CBA of the 1er BEP.

Traditions

Insignias 
The insignia of the Foreign Legion Paratroopers of France represents a closed "winged armed dextrochere", meaning a "right winged arm" armed with a sword pointing upwards. The Insignia makes reference to the Patron of Paratroopers. In fact, the Insignia represents "the right Arm of Saint Michael", the Archangel which according to Liturgy is the "Armed Arm of God". This Insignia is the symbol of righteous combat and fidelity to superior missions.

Battalion Colors

Battalion Song

Decorations

Honours

Battle honours

Battalion commanders

1st Foreign Parachute Battalion, 1er BEP (1948–1955 ) - I, II, III Formations -

Notable officers and legionnaires 
 Rémy Raffalli
 Roger Faulques

References 

Parachute Battalion 01
Military units and formations established in 1948
Military units and formations disestablished in 1955